Anglo-American Legal Bibliographies: An Annotated Guide is a book written by William Lawrence Friend and published in 1944 by the United States Government Printing Office. It is a metabibliography which contains entries for 298 Anglo-American legal bibliographies.

Glanville Williams advised students, who want to conduct deeper research than an ordinary practitioner would, to look at this book.

References
Anglo-American legal bibliographies, an annotated guide, by William L. Friend (1944). Catalogue record and digitised copies from HathiTrust.
Anglo-American legal bibliographies; an annotated guide. By William L. Friend (1968) Reprint. Catalogue record and search from HathiTrust.
Smith, Vernon M (1945) 33 California Law Review 165 JSTOR
Beardsley, Arthur S (1945) 15 The Library Quarterly 173 JSTOR
TEL (1945) 9  Cambridge Law Journal 142 JSTOR
WPMK (1945) 6 The University of Toronto Law Journal 292 JSTOR
TFT Plucknett (1946) 9 Modern Law Review 206 JSTOR

Legal bibliographies